In mathematics, Borel–de Siebenthal theory describes the closed connected subgroups of a compact Lie group that have maximal rank, i.e. contain a maximal torus. It is named after the Swiss mathematicians Armand Borel and Jean de Siebenthal who developed the theory in 1949. Each such subgroup is the identity component of the centralizer of its center. They can be described recursively in terms of the associated root system of the group. The subgroups for which the corresponding homogeneous space has an invariant complex structure correspond to parabolic subgroups in the complexification of the compact Lie group, a reductive algebraic group.

Connected subgroups of maximal rank
Let G be connected compact Lie group with maximal torus T. Hopf showed that the centralizer of a torus S ⊆ T is a connected closed subgroup containing T, so of  maximal rank. Indeed, if x is in CG(S), there is a maximal torus containing both S and x and it is contained in CG(S).

Borel and de Siebenthal proved that the connected closed subgroups of maximal rank are precisely the identity components of the centralizers of their centers.

Their result  relies on a fact from representation theory. The weights of an irreducible representation of a connected compact semisimple group K with highest weight λ can be easily described (without their multiplicities): they are precisely the saturation under the Weyl group of the dominant weights obtained by subtracting off a sum of simple roots from λ. In particular, if the irreducible representation is trivial on the center of K (a finite abelian group), 0 is a weight.

To prove the characterization of Borel and de Siebenthal, let H be a closed connected subgroup of G containing T with center Z. The identity component L of CG(Z) contains H. If it were strictly larger, the restriction of the adjoint representation of L to H would be trivial on Z. Any irreducible summand, orthogonal to the Lie algebra of H, would provide non-zero weight zero vectors for T / Z ⊆ H / Z, contradicting the maximality of the torus T / Z in L / Z.

Maximal connected subgroups of maximal rank
Borel and de Siebenthal classified the maximal closed connected subgroups of maximal rank of a connected compact Lie group.

The general classification of connected closed subgroups of maximal rank can be reduced to this case, because any connected subgroup of maximal rank is contained in a finite chain of such subgroups, each maximal in the next one. Maximal subgroups are the identity components of any element of their center not belonging to the center of the whole group.

The problem of determining the maximal connected subgroups of maximal rank can be further reduced to the case where the compact Lie group is simple. In fact the Lie algebra  of a connected compact Lie group G splits as a direct sum of the ideals

where  is the center and the other factors  are simple. If T is a maximal torus, its Lie algebra  has a corresponding splitting

Thus if

then

For that factor, the closed connected subgroup of the corresponding simply connected simple compact Lie group is maximal and of maximal rank.

Let G be a connected simply connected compact simple Lie group with maximal torus T. Let  be the Lie algebra of G and  that of T. Let Δ be the corresponding root system. Choose a set of positive roots and corresponding simple roots α1, ..., αn.

with mi ≥ 1. (The number of mi equal to 1 is equal to |Z| – 1, where Z is the center of G.)

The Weyl alcove is defined by

Élie Cartan showed that it is a fundamental domain for the affine Weyl group.

The Weyl alcove A is a simplex with vertices at

where αi(Xj) = δij.

The main result of Borel and de Siebenthal is as follows.

The structure of the corresponding subgroup H1 can be described in both cases. It is semisimple in the second case with a system of simple roots obtained by replacing αi by −α0. In the first case it is the direct product of the circle group generated by Xi and a semisimple compact group with a system of simple roots obtained by omitting αi.

The maximal subalgebras  of maximal rank are either non-semisimple or semisimple. The non-semisimple ones are obtained by deleting two nodes from the extended diagram with coefficient one. The Dynkin diagrams for the semisimple ones are obtained by removing one node with coefficient a prime. This leads to the following possibilities:

 An: Ap × A n − p − 1 × T (non-semisimple)
 Bn: Dn or Bp × Dn − p (semisimple), Bn − 1 × T (non-semisimple)
 Cn: Cp × Cn − p (SS), An - 1 × T (NSS)
 Dn: Dp × Dn - p (SS), Dn - 1 × T, An-1 × T (NSS)
 E6: A1 × A5, A2 × A2 × A2 (SS), D5 × T (NSS)
 E7: A1 × D6, A2 × A5, A7 (SS), E6 × T (NSS)
 E8: D8, A8, A4 × A4, E6 × A2, E7 × A1 (SS)
 F4: B4, A2 × A2, A1 × C3 (SS)
 G2: A2, A1 × A1 (SS)

All the corresponding homogeneous spaces are symmetric, since the subalgebra is the fixed point algebra of an inner automorphism of period 2, apart from G2/A2, F4/A2×A2, E6/A2×A2×A2, E7/A2×A5 and all the E8 spaces other than E8/D8 and E8/E7×A1. In all these exceptional cases the subalgebra is the fixed point algebra of an inner automorphism of period 3, except for E8/A4×A4 where the automorphism has period 5. 

To prove the theorem, note that H1 is the identity component of the centralizer of an element exp T with T in 2π A. Stabilizers increase in moving from a subsimplex to an edge or vertex, so T either lies on an edge or is a vertex. If it lies on an edge than that edge connects 0 to a vertex vi with mi = 1, which is the first case. If T is a vertex vi and mi has a non-trivial factor m, then mT has a larger stabilizer than T, contradicting maximality. So mi must be prime. Maximality can be checked directly using the fact that an intermediate subgroup  K would have the same form, so that its center would be either (a) T or (b) an element of prime order. If the center of H1 is 'T, each simple root with mi prime is already a root of K, so (b) is not possible; and if (a) holds, αi is the only root that could be omitted with mj = 1, so K = H1. If the center of H1 is of prime order, αj is a root of K for mj = 1, so that (a) is not possible; if (b) holds, then the only possible omitted simple root is αi, so that K = H1.

Closed subsystems of roots
A subset Δ1 ⊂ Δ is called a closed subsystem if whenever α and β lie in Δ1 with α + β in Δ, then  α + β lies in Δ1. Two subsystems Δ1 and Δ2 are said to be equivalent if σ( Δ1) = Δ2 for some σ in W = NG(T) / T, the Weyl group. Thus for a closed subsystem

 
is a subalgebra of  containing ; and conversely any such subalgebra gives rise to a closed subsystem. Borel and de Siebenthal classified the maximal closed subsystems up to equivalence.

This result is a consequence of the Borel–de Siebenthal theorem for maximal connected subgroups of maximal rank. It can also be proved directly within the theory of root systems and reflection groups.

Applications to symmetric spaces of compact type
Let G be a connected compact semisimple Lie group, σ an automorphism of G of period 2 and Gσ the fixed point subgroup of σ.  Let K be a closed subgroup of G lying between Gσ and its identity component. The compact homogeneous space G / K is called a symmetric space of compact type. The Lie algebra  admits a decomposition

where , the Lie algebra of K, is the +1 eigenspace of σ and  the –1 eigenspace.

G / K is then a Riemannian symmetric space of compact type.

In fact there is a one-one correspondence between intermediate subalgebras  and K-invariant subspaces 
 of  given by

Any orthogonal symmetric algebra  (σ) can be decomposed as an (orthogonal) direct sum of irreducible orthogonal symmetric algebras.

In fact  can be written as a direct sum of simple algebras

which are permuted by the automorphism σ. If σ interchanges two simple summands, the corresponding pair is isomorphic to a diagonal inclusion of K in K × K, with K simple, so is also irreducible. The involution σ just swaps the two factors
σ(x,y)=(y,x).

This decomposition of an orthogonal symmetric algebra yields a direct product decomposition of the corresponding compact symmetric space G / K when G is simply connected. In this case the fixed point subgroup Gσ is automatically connected (this is no longer true, even for inner involutions, if G is not simply connected). For simply connected G, the symmetric space G / K is the direct product of the two kinds of symmetric spaces Gi / Ki or H × H / H. Non-simply connected symmetric space of compact type arise as
quotients of the simply connected space G / K by finite abelian groups. In fact if

let

and let Δi be the subgroup of Γi fixed by all automorphisms of Gi preserving Ki (i.e. automorphisms of the orthogonal symmetric Lie algebra). Then

is a finite abelian group acting freely on G / K. The non-simply connected symmetric spaces arise as quotients by subgroups of Δ. The subgroup can be identified with the fundamental group, which is thus a finite abelian group.

The classification of compact symmetric spaces or pairs (σ) thus reduces to the case where G is a connected simple compact Lie group. There are two possibilities: either the automorphism σ is inner, in which case K has maximal rank and the theory of Borel and de Siebenthal applies; or the automorphism σ is outer, so that, because σ preserves a maximal torus, the rank of K is less than the rank of G and σ corresponds to an automorphism of the Dynkin diagram modulo inner automorphisms.  determines directly all possible σ in the latter case: they correspond to the symmetric spaces
SU(n)/SO(n), SU(2n)/Sp(n), SO(a+b)/SO(a)×SO(b) (a and b odd), E6/F4 and E6/C4.

Applications to hermitian symmetric spaces of compact type
The equal rank case with K non-semisimple corresponds exactly to the Hermitian symmetric spaces G / K of compact type.

Replacing A and B by JA and JB, it follows that

Since  is semisimple, δ must be an inner derivation, so that

If on the other hand G / K is irreducible with K non-semisimple, the compact group G must be simple and K of maximal rank. From the theorem of Borel and de Siebenthal, the involution σ is inner and K is the centralizer of a torus S. It follows that G / K is simply connected and there is a parabolic subgroup P in the complexification GC of G such that G / K = GC / P. In particular there is a complex structure on G / K and the action of G is holomorphic.

In general any compact hermitian symmetric space is simply connected and can be written as a direct product of irreducible hermitian symmetric spaces Gi / Ki with Gi simple. The irreducible ones are exactly the non-semisimple cases described above.

Notes

References

Lie algebras
Algebraic groups
Lie groups
Representation theory